

Religious departments in higher education 
Faith based services provide access to activities, events and counselling that allow students to pursue spiritual growth and development. Many campuses offer multi-faith spaces, ministering to those who identify with a specific religious group or those who consider themselves spiritual but not religious.

Canadian campus faith and spirituality 
Many Canadian universities offer multi-faith chaplaincy services. Chaplains may offer faith-specific support and counselling for students, staff, and faculty dealing with stress, grief or loneliness, or they can be present for non-religious students with questions about faith and for those wrestling with spiritual meaning in their lives. Overall, chaplains are committed to supporting the spiritual well-being of the university community using a holistic approach. Chaplains can run worship services, social events, or meal programs.  Universities may offer multi-faith rooms for prayer or reflection.

Christian groups
The need for pastoral services in secular universities can be traced back to the writings of John Henry Newman advocating for societies of Catholic students to be established at secular universities in England. The rising popularity of public universities in many parts of the world over sectarian private universities also necessitated a need for Christian ministerial services for students. At the same time Christian churches in the vicinity of colleges and universities may provide worship and ministerial services to local students.

Roman Catholic
In the United States there are about 250 Catholic Newman Centers that minister to Catholic students at public universities. They trace their origin to the Newman movement and are ministered by laypeople, local parishes, or religious institutes. More recently, lay apostolates such as the Fellowship of Catholic University Students (FOCUS), established in 1997, are ministering to and re-evangelizing Catholic university students and young adults.

Latter-Day Saint
LDS Student Association of the Church of Jesus Christ of Latter-day Saints

Protestant
Protestant Christian and ecumenical groups following their establishment also created ministries especially focused on evangelizing students. One most recognizable group is Cru, originally known as Campus Crusade for Christ, an interdenominational Christian ministry established in 1951 on the campus of UCLA which has ministries in over a thousand universities. Various other evangelical groups have worldwide networks of campus ministries including the International Fellowship of Evangelical Students, World Student Christian Federation, and The Navigators. Often Protestant denominations will also have a related para-church student fellowship ministry or college group directly or indirectly affiliated with their denomination, sometimes named by it. Additionally, independent churches will often have college ministries which may extend onto constituent college campuses in the form of a student organization.
List of multi-campus protestant college ministries:
Adventist Christian Fellowship of the Seventh-day Adventist Church
American Baptist Campus Ministry of the American Baptist Convention
Baptist Student Union of the Southern Baptist Convention
Chi Alpha (multi-denominational but nationally affiliated with: Chi Alpha Campus Ministries of the Assemblies of God)
Coalition for Christian Outreach (CCO)
Cru, originally Campus Crusade for Christ
International Fellowship of Evangelical Students
InterVarsity Christian Fellowship
Lutheran Student Movement of the Evangelical Lutheran Church in America
Missionary Baptist Student Fellowship of the American Baptist Association
The Navigators
Reformed University Fellowship of the Presbyterian Church in America
UKirk of the Presbyterian Church (USA)
Wesley Foundation of the United Methodist Church
World Student Christian Federation
Young Life College

Orthodox

India 

 Mar Gregorios Orthodox Christian Student Movement (MGOCSM) of the Malankara Orthodox Syrian Church
 Mor Gregorios Jacobite Student Movement of the Jacobite Syrian Church

Jewish groups
Chabad on Campus Foundation
Hillel Society
World Union of Jewish Students and regional affiliates

References

 
Lists of organizations